Burgers' equation or Bateman–Burgers equation is a fundamental partial differential equation and convection–diffusion equation occurring in various areas of applied mathematics, such as fluid mechanics, nonlinear acoustics, gas dynamics, and traffic flow. The equation was first introduced by Harry Bateman in 1915 and later studied by Johannes Martinus Burgers in 1948.

For a given field  and diffusion coefficient (or kinematic viscosity, as in the original fluid mechanical context) , the general form of Burgers' equation (also known as viscous Burgers' equation) in one space dimension is the dissipative system:

When the diffusion term is absent (i.e. ), Burgers' equation becomes the inviscid Burgers' equation:

which is a prototype for conservation equations that can develop discontinuities (shock waves). The previous equation is the advective form of the Burgers' equation. The conservative form is found to be more useful in numerical integration

Terms 
In a system consisting of a moving viscous fluid with one spatial and one temporal dimension, e.g. a thin ideal pipe with fluid running through it, Burgers' equation describes the speed of the fluid at each location along the pipe as time progresses. The terms of the equation represent the following quantities:

 : spatial coordinate
 : temporal coordinate
 : speed of fluid at the indicated spatial and temporal coordinates
 : viscosity of fluid

The viscosity is a constant physical property of the fluid, and the other parameters represent the dynamics contingent on that viscosity.

Inviscid Burgers' equation

The inviscid Burgers' equation is a conservation equation, more generally a first order quasilinear hyperbolic equation. The solution to the equation and along with the initial condition

can be constructed by the method of characteristics. The characteristic equations are

Integration of the second equation tells us that  is constant along the characteristic and integration of the first equation shows that the characteristics are straight lines, i.e.,

where  is the point (or parameter) on the x-axis (t = 0) of the x-t plane from which the characteristic curve is drawn. Since  at -axis is known from the initial condition and the fact that  is unchanged as we move along the characteristic emanating from each point , we write  on each characteristic.

Thus, the solution is given by

This is an implicit relation that determines the solution of the inviscid Burgers' equation provided characteristics don't intersect.  If the characteristics do intersect, then a classical solution to the PDE does not exist and leads to the formation of a shock wave. Whether characteristics can intersect or not depends on the initial condition. In fact, the breaking time before a shock wave can be formed is given by

Inviscid Burgers' equation for linear initial condition

Subrahmanyan Chandrasekhar provided the explicit solution in 1943 when the initial condition  is linear, i.e., where a and b are constants. The explicit solution is

This solution is  also the complete integral of the inviscid Burgers' equation because it contains as many arbitrary constants as the number of independent variables appearing in the equation. Using this complete integral, Chandrasekhar obtained the general solution described for arbitrary initial conditions from the envelope of the complete integral.

Viscous Burgers' equation

The viscous Burgers' equation can be converted to a linear equation by the Cole–Hopf transformation,

which turns it into the  equation

where  is a function that depends on boundary conditions. If  identically (e.g. if the problem is to be solved on a periodic domain), then we get the diffusion equation

The diffusion equation can be solved, and the Cole–Hopf transformation inverted, to obtain the solution to the Burgers' equation:

Other forms

Generalized Burgers' equation

The generalized Burgers' equation extends the quasilinear convective to more generalized form, i.e.,

where  is any arbitrary function of u.

Stochastic Burgers' equation

Added space-time noise , where  is an  Wiener process, forms a stochastic Burgers' equation

This stochastic PDE is the one-dimensional version of Kardar–Parisi–Zhang equation in a field  upon substituting .

See also
Euler–Tricomi equation
Chaplygin's equation
Conservation equation
Fokker–Planck equation

References

External links
 Burgers' Equation at EqWorld: The World of Mathematical Equations.
 Burgers' Equation at NEQwiki, the nonlinear equations encyclopedia.

Conservation equations
Equations of fluid dynamics
Fluid dynamics